Hernan José Gamboa Alexis, better known as Hernan José Gamboa Alexis  (June 18, 1946 – January 10, 2016) was a Venezuelan musician, composer and singer. He was a member of the Venezuelan fold music group Serenata Guayanesa, and later released separate albums.

Biography 
The first of seven sons between musician and composer Carmito Gamboa Almeida y Carmen Alexis de Gamboa, Gamboa grew up around music. He studies music with his father, who taught him to play the traditional Venezuelan instrument, the Cuatro, as well as the guitar and various other instruments.

In 1970, Gamboa helped found Serenata Guayanesa with his friends and colleagues Mauricio Castro Rodríguez and the brothers Iván and César Pérez Rossi. He was the cuatrista and tenor voice in the group, which from 1972 until he left the group in 1983, recorded 10 albums.

In 1977, While still a part of the Serenata Guauanesa, Gamboa launched his solo career by signing with the Venezuelan record company PROMUS. In August of that year, he released his first solo album, "El Cuatro de Venezuela." Then in 1983, he decided to focus all his attention on his solo career, and hence left the Serenata Guyanesa. He released a total of 25 solo albums in his lifetime.

Gamboa began suffering from muscular dystrophy, and in 1992 decided to move to the United States in order to get a clearer diagnosis and the help he needed. He lived in Miami for a while, before moving to Buenos Aires, Argentina in 2010, where he continued his musical career until his death.

In August 2015, Gamboa was diagnosed with lung cancer, which he would die of several months later on January 10, 2016.

Nominations 
He was nominated for the Latin Grammy's for three of his records:  El mundo en cuatro cuerdas (1993), Serenatas en contrapuntos (2006) and La Fiesta (2007), although he never won one.

References

External links 
Interview to Hernán Gamboa in VOZZ.tv for the concert to Simón Díaz
VeinteMundos article about Hernán Gamboa
Hernán Gamboa Info & music 
Hernán Gamboa Discography  

1946 births
2016 deaths
Male composers
People from Anzoátegui
Venezuelan composers
Venezuelan-cuatro players
Venezuelan folk singers
Deaths from cancer in Argentina
Deaths from lung cancer